The African Queen is a 1951 British-American adventure film adapted from the 1935 novel of the same name by C. S. Forester. The film was directed by John Huston and produced by Sam Spiegel and John Woolf. The screenplay was adapted by James Agee, John Huston, John Collier and Peter Viertel. It was photographed in Technicolor by Jack Cardiff and has a music score by Allan Gray. The film stars Humphrey Bogart (who won the Academy Award for Best Actor, his only Oscar) and Katharine Hepburn with Robert Morley, Peter Bull, Walter Gotell, Richard Marner and Theodore Bikel.

The African Queen was selected for preservation in the United States National Film Registry in 1994, and the Library of Congress deemed it "culturally, historically or aesthetically significant."

Plot 
Samuel Sayer and his sister Rose are British missionaries in German East Africa in August 1914. Their post and supplies are delivered by a small steamboat named the African Queen, helmed by the rough-and-ready Canadian mechanic Charlie Allnut, whose coarse behavior they stiffly tolerate.

When Charlie warns the Sayers that war has broken out between Germany and Britain, they choose to remain in Kungdu, only to witness German colonial troops burn down the village and herd the villagers away to be pressed into service. When Samuel protests, he is struck by an officer and soon becomes delirious with fever, dying shortly afterward. Charlie helps Rose bury her brother and they escape in the African Queen.

After some persuasion, Charlie goes along with the plan.

Charlie allows Rose to navigate the river by rudder while he tends the engine, and she is emboldened after they pass the first set of rapids with minimal flooding in the boat. When they pass the German fortress, the soldiers begin shooting at them, damaging the boiler. Charlie manages to reattach a pressure hose just as they are about to enter the second set of rapids. The boat rolls and pitches as it goes down the rapids, leading to more severe flooding on the deck. While celebrating their success, Charlie and Rose find themselves in an embrace and kiss. The third set of rapids damages the boat's propeller shaft. Rigging up a primitive forge on shore, Charlie straightens the shaft and welds a new blade onto the propeller, allowing the two to set off again.

All appears lost when the boat becomes mired in the mud and dense reeds near the mouth of the river. With no supplies left and short of potable water, Rose and a feverish Charlie pass out, both accepting that they will soon die. Rose says a quiet prayer. As they sleep, torrential rains raise the river's level and float the African Queen into the lake.

Over the next two days, Charlie and Rose prepare for their attack. The  returns and Charlie and Rose steam the African Queen out onto the lake in darkness, intending to set her on a collision course. A strong storm strikes, causing water to pour into the African Queen through the torpedo holes. Eventually the boat capsizes, throwing Charlie and Rose into the water. Charlie loses sight of Rose in the storm.

Charlie is captured and taken aboard the Königin Luise, where he is interrogated by German officers. Believing that Rose has drowned, he makes no attempt to defend himself against accusations of spying and the German captain sentences him to death by hanging. Rose is brought aboard the ship just after Charlie's sentence is pronounced. The captain questions her, and Rose proudly confesses the plot to sink the Königin Luise, deciding that they have nothing to lose. The captain sentences her to be executed with Charlie, both as British spies. Charlie asks the German captain to marry them before they are executed. The ship has struck the overturned submerged hull of the African Queen and detonated the torpedoes. The newly married couple is able to escape the sinking ship and swim to safety together.

Cast 
 Humphrey Bogart as Charlie Allnut
 Katharine Hepburn as Rose Sayer
 Robert Morley as Reverend Samuel Sayer, "The Brother"
 Peter Bull as the Captain of the 
 Theodore Bikel as the First Officer of the 
 Walter Gotell as the Second Officer of the 
 Peter Swanwick as the First Officer of Fort Shona
 Richard Marner as the Second Officer of Fort Shona

Production 

Production censors objected to several aspects of the original script, such as the two unmarried characters cohabiting the boat (as in the book), and some changes were made before the film was completed. Another change followed the casting of Bogart; his character's lines in the original screenplay were rendered with a thick Cockney dialect, but the script had to be completely rewritten because he was unwilling to attempt the accent. The rewrite made the character Canadian.

The film was partially financed by John and James Woolf of Romulus Films, a British company. Michael Balcon, an advisor to the National Film Finance Corporation, advised the NFFC to refuse a loan to the Woolfs unless the film starred his former Ealing Studios actors John McCallum and Googie Withers rather than Humphrey Bogart and Katharine Hepburn, whom the Woolfs wanted. The Woolfs persuaded NFFC chairman Lord Reith to overrule Balcon, and the film went ahead. The Woolfs provided £250,000 and were so pleased with the completed film that they convinced John Huston to direct their next picture, Moulin Rouge (1952).

Much of the film was shot on location in Uganda and the Congo in Africa. This was rather novel for the time, especially for a Technicolor picture that used large, cumbersome "Three-Strip" cameras. The cast and crew endured sickness and spartan living conditions during their time on location. In the early scene in which Hepburn plays an organ in the church, a bucket was placed off-camera in which she could vomit between takes because she was sick. Bogart later bragged that he and Huston were the only members of the cast and crew who escaped illness, which he credited to having drunk whiskey on location rather than the local water.

About half of the film was shot in the UK. The scenes in which Bogart and Hepburn are seen in the water were all shot in studio tanks at Worton Hall Studios in Isleworth, near London. These scenes were considered too dangerous to shoot in Africa. All of the foreground plates for the process shots were also filmed in studio. A myth has grown that the scenes in the reed-filled riverbank were filmed in Dalyan, Turkey, but in her book about the filming, Hepburn stated: "We were about to head... back to Entebbe but John [Huston] wanted to get shots of Bogie and me in the miles of high reeds before we come out into the lake...". The sequence was shot on location in Africa and at the London studios. The shots of the German-occupied Fort Shona were all filmed at Worton Hall, where a fortress set was constructed from tubular scaffolding and covered with plaster.

Scenes on the boat were filmed using a large raft with a mockup of the boat on top. Sections of the boat set could be removed to make room for the large Technicolor camera. This proved hazardous on one occasion when the boat's boiler, a heavy copper replica, almost fell on Hepburn. It was not secured to the deck because it also had to be moved to accommodate the camera. The small steamboat used to depict the African Queen was built in 1912 in Britain for service in Africa. At one time it was owned by actor Fess Parker. The boat was restored in April 2012 and is now on display as a tourist attraction in Key Largo, Florida.

Because of the dangers involved with shooting the rapids scenes, a small-scale model was used in the studio tank in London. The vessel used to portray the German gunboat Königin Luise was the steam tug Buganda, owned and operated on Lake Victoria by the East African Railways and Harbours Corporation.

A persistent rumor holds that London's population of feral ring-necked parakeets originated from birds that escaped or were released during filming of The African Queen.

Premiere 
The African Queen opened on December 26, 1951, at the Fox Wilshire Theatre in Beverly Hills in time to qualify for the 24th Academy Awards. The film opened in New York City on February 20, 1952, at the Capitol Theatre.

Reception and box office 
Contemporary critical reviews were mostly positive. Edwin Schallert of the Los Angeles Times wrote that the film "should impress for its novelty both in casting and scenically," and found the ending "rather contrived and even incredible, but melodramatic enough, with almost a western accent, to be popularly effective." Bosley Crowther of The New York Times called the film "a slick job of movie hoodwinking with a thoroughly implausible romance, set in a frame of wild adventure that is as whopping as its tale of off-beat love ... This is not noted with disfavor." Crowther added that "Mr. Huston merits credit for putting this fantastic tale on a level of sly, polite kidding and generally keeping it there, while going about the happy business of engineering excitement and visual thrills."

Variety called The African Queen "an engrossing motion picture ... Performance-wise, Bogart has never been seen to better advantage. Nor has he ever had a more knowing, talented film partner than Miss Hepburn." John McCarten of The New Yorker declared that "Katharine Hepburn and Humphrey Bogart come up with a couple of remarkable performances, and it's fortunate that they do, for the movie concentrates on them so single-mindedly that any conspicuous uncertainty in their acting would have left the whole thing high and dry." Richard L. Coe wrote in The Washington Post that "Huston has tried a risky trick and most of the time pulls it off in delicious style. And from both his stars he has drawn performances which have rightly been nominated for those Academy Awards on the [20th]."

Harrison's Reports printed a negative review, writing that the film "has its moments of comedy and excitement, but on the whole the dialogue is childish, the action silly, and the story bereft of human appeal. The characters act as childishly as they talk, and discriminating picture-goers will, no doubt, laugh at them. There is nothing romantic about either Katharine Hepburn or Humphrey Bogart, for both look bedraggled throughout." The Monthly Film Bulletin was also negative, writing: "Huston seems to have been aiming at a measured, quiet, almost digressive tempo, but the material does not support it, and would have benefited by the incisiveness his previous films have shown. In spite of Hepburn's wonderful playing, and some engaging scenes, the film must be accounted a misfire."

The film earned an estimated £256,267 at UK cinemas in 1952, making it the 11th-most-popular film of the year. It earned an estimated $4 million in North American theatrical rentals and $6 million worldwide.

On review aggregation site Rotten Tomatoes the film has a 96% rating based on 47 reviews, with an average rating of 8.8/10. The website's critical consensus reads: "Perfectly cast, smartly written, and beautifully filmed, The African Queen remains thrilling, funny, and effortlessly absorbing even after more than half a century's worth of adventure movies borrowing liberally from its creative DNA." On Metacritic it has a score of 91% based on reviews from 15 critics, indicating "universal acclaim".

Differences from the novel
In 1935, when the novella The African Queen by C. S. Forester was published, many British people believed that World War I was a grievous mistake that could have been avoided. In the novella, the Germans are the antagonists, not the villains, and are depicted as noble and chivalrous opponents of the British, who are likewise equally noble and honorable. The overall message of the novella was that the war was a tragedy in which decent people killed one another for unfathomable reasons and that both sides suffered equally.

However, when the film version of The African Queen was released in 1951, memories of World War II were still fresh and the film's German characters are far more villainous than they are in the novella. The common perception that World War II was a crusade against evil influenced the script of The African Queen. In the novella, the Germans capture Rose and Charlie, but release them in a magnanimous gesture, unaware of their failed plot. In the film, Rose and Charlie are sentenced to death after their capture.

In the novella, Charlie and Rose fail in their attempt to sink the Königin Luise, and it is instead sunk by a Royal Navy gunboat as Rose and Charlie watch from the shore. In the film, the African Queen causes the sinking of the Königin Luise – the Royal Navy gunboat does not appear in the movie.

Accolades

Others 
American Film Institute recognition
 1998 – AFI's 100 Years...100 Movies – #17
 2002 – AFI's 100 Years...100 Passions – #14
 2005 – AFI's 100 Years...100 Movie Quotes:
 Charlie Allnut: "A man takes a drop too much once in a while, it's only human nature."
 Rose Sayer: "'Nature,' Mr. Allnut, is what we are put into this world to rise above." – Nominated
 2006 – AFI's 100 Years...100 Cheers – #48
 2007 – AFI's 100 Years...100 Movies (10th Anniversary Edition) – #65

AFI has also honored both Humphrey Bogart and Katharine Hepburn as the greatest American screen legends.

Subsequent releases 
The film was released on Region 2 DVD in the United Kingdom, Germany and Scandinavia. The British DVD includes a theatrical trailer and an audio commentary by cinematographer Jack Cardiff in which he details many of the hardships and challenges involved in filming in Africa.

Prior to 2010, the film had been released in the United States on VHS video, LaserDisc and as a Region 1 DVD.

2009 digital restoration 
In 2009, Paramount Pictures (the current owner of the film's American rights) completed restoration work for Region 1, and a 4K digitally restored version from the original camera negative was issued on DVD and Blu-ray on March 23, 2010. The film was restored with its original mono soundtrack from original UK film elements under the sole supervision of Paramount, and had as an extra a documentary on the film's production, Embracing Chaos: The Making of The African Queen. Romulus Films and international-rights holder ITV Studios were acknowledged in the restoration credits.

ITV released the restoration in Region 2 on June 14, 2010.

Adaptations in other media 
The African Queen was adapted as a one-hour Lux Radio Theater play on December 15, 1952. Bogart reprised his film role and was joined by Greer Garson. This broadcast is included as a bonus CD in the commemorative box-set version of the Paramount DVD.

The March 26, 1962 episode of The Dick Powell Theater, titled Safari, was based on the story, with James Coburn and Glynis Johns in the lead roles.

A 1977 television film continued the adventures of Charlie and Rose, with Warren Oates and Mariette Hartley in the lead roles. Though intended as the pilot for a series, it was not picked up. An elliptic commentary on the making of The African Queen can be found in the 1990 film White Hunter Black Heart, directed by Clint Eastwood.

The African Queen partially inspired the Jungle Cruise attraction at Disneyland. Imagineer Harper Goff referenced the film frequently in his ideas, and his designs for the ride vehicles were inspired by the steamer used in the film.

The African Queen 

One of the two boats used as the African Queen is actually the 35-foot (10 m) L.S. Livingston, which had been a working diesel boat for 40 years; the steam engine was a prop and the real diesel engine was hidden under stacked crates of gin and other cargo. Florida attorney and Humphrey Bogart enthusiast Jim Hendricks Sr. purchased the boat in 1982 in Key Largo, Florida. After falling into a state of disrepair following Hendricks' 2001 death, the ship was discovered rusting in a Florida marina in 2012 by Suzanne Holmquist and her engineer husband Lance. The couple repaired and refurbished the ailing ship and made it available to tourists and film enthusiasts, providing cruises around the Florida Keys.

References

Specific

Bibliography 
 
 Farwell, Byron. The Great War in Africa, 1914–1918. 2nd ed. New York City: W. W. Norton & Company, 1989.
 Foden, Giles (2005). "Mimi and Toutou Go Forth: The Bizarre Battle of Lake Tanganyika". Penguin Books Ltd. 
 Hagberg Wright, C.T. German Methods of Development in Africa Journal of the Royal African Society 1.1 (1901): 23–38. Historical. J-Stor. Golden Library, ENMU. 18 April. 2005
 Henderson, William Otto. The German Colonial Empire. Portland: International Specialized Book Services, Inc, 1993.
 Hepburn, Katharine (1987). The Making of the African Queen, or: How I Went to Africa with Bogart, Bacall and Huston and Almost Lost My Mind (Knopf)
 Tibbetts, John C., And James M, Welsh, eds. The Encyclopedia of Novels Into Film (2005) pp 5–6..
 Werner, A, and R Dilthey. "German and British Colonisation in Africa." Journal of the Royal African Society 4.14 (1905): 238–41. Historical. J-Stor. Golden Library, ENMU. 18 April. 2005.

External links 

 
 
 
 
 The African Queen on Lux Radio Theater: December 15, 1952
 The African Queen essay by Daniel Eagan in America's Film Legacy: The Authoritative Guide to the Landmark Movies in the National Film Registry, A&C Black, 2010 , pages 453-454 

1950s adventure drama films
1950s romance films
1951 films
American adventure drama films
Articles containing video clips
British adventure drama films
1950s English-language films
Films based on British novels
Films based on works by C. S. Forester
Films based on romance novels
Films directed by John Huston
Films featuring a Best Actor Academy Award-winning performance
Films produced by Sam Spiegel
Films set in 1914
Films set in Burundi
Films set in jungles
Films set in Rwanda
Films set in Tanzania
Films set on boats
Films shot in the Democratic Republic of the Congo
Films shot in England
Films shot in Turkey
Films shot in Uganda
Films shot in the United States
1950s German-language films
Horizon Pictures films
Films with screenplays by John Huston
River adventure films
Swahili-language films
United Artists films
United States National Film Registry films
World War I films based on actual events
World War I films set in Africa
World War I naval films
Films with screenplays by James Agee
1951 drama films
1950s American films
1950s British films